Sieg is a river in Germany.

Sieg may also refer to:

People 
 Carl Sieg (1784–1845), German painter and lithographer
 Victor Sieg (1837–1899), French composer and organist
 Lee Paul Sieg (1879–1963), a former president of the University of Washington
 Paul Eugen Sieg (1899–1950), German physicist and writer
 John Sieg (1903–1942), railroad worker and journalist who publicized Nazi atrocities
 Jack Sieg, American swimmer who used the butterfly stroke in 1935
 Shane Sieg (1982–2017), NASCAR driver
 Ryan Sieg (born 1987), NASCAR driver
 Trent Sieg (born 1995), American football long snapper
 Kyle Sieg (born 2001), NASCAR driver

Other 
 Sieg automatic rifle